Mantidactylus pauliani is a species of frog in the family Mantellidae.
It is endemic to Madagascar.
Its natural habitats are subtropical or tropical moist montane forests, subtropical or tropical high-altitude grassland, and rivers.
It is threatened by habitat loss.

References

pauliani
Endemic frogs of Madagascar
Taxa named by Jean Marius René Guibé
Taxonomy articles created by Polbot
Amphibians described in 1974